Alena Yuryevna Prokopenko (born 29 September 1992) is a Russian judoka.

She participated at the 2018 World Judo Championships, winning a medal.

In 2020, she competed in the women's 70 kg event at the 2020 European Judo Championships held in Prague, Czech Republic.

References

External links
 

1992 births
Living people
Russian female judoka
Judoka at the 2019 European Games
European Games medalists in judo
European Games gold medalists for Russia
Sportspeople from Saint Petersburg
21st-century Russian women